Keever David Jankovich (January 6, 1928 – February 23, 1979) was an American football player who played two seasons in the National Football League with the Dallas Texans and Chicago Cardinals. He was drafted by the Cleveland Browns in the fifth round of the 1952 NFL Draft. He first enrolled at Santa Ana Junior College before transferring to the University of Utah and lastly the University of the Pacific. He attended Tooele High School in Tooele, Utah.

References

External links
Just Sports Stats

1928 births
1979 deaths
Players of American football from North Carolina
American football linebackers
Utah Utes football players
Pacific Tigers football players
Dallas Texans (NFL) players
Chicago Cardinals players
Sportspeople from Wilmington, North Carolina